Im Dong-sil (born 15 January 1937) is a South Korean athlete. He competed in the men's hammer throw at the 1964 Summer Olympics.

References

1937 births
Living people
Athletes (track and field) at the 1964 Summer Olympics
South Korean male hammer throwers
Olympic athletes of South Korea
Place of birth missing (living people)
20th-century South Korean people